Saturday Freedom (literally Declaration of Freedom Saturday) was a South Korean reality-variety show shown on the KBS2 network, which competes directly against MBC's We Got Married and Infinite Challenge, and SBS' Star Junior Show Bungeoppang and Star King. The lineup ended on March 31, 2012, with Immortal Songs 2 becoming a separate program and Invincible Youth 2 moving into the time slot.

History 
Programs prior to Saturday Freedom featured a similar title. Declaration of Freedom Today is Saturday (자유선언 오늘은 토요일) began airing on October 17, 1998, and aired until April 28, 2001. Beginning on May 5, 2001, Show Everyone's Saturday (쇼 여러분의 토요일) aired, then on November 10, 2001 Declaration of Freedom Saturday Big Operation (자유선언 토요대작전) took over and aired until November 1, 2003, which at this time KBS's Saturday lineup program was cancelled. It was revived on April 25, 2009, as Invincible Saturday (천하무적 토요일) and aired until December 25, 2010, and KBS's Saturday lineup program was cancelled once again. It was revived again as Saturday Freedom on June 4, 2011. On September 10, 2011, Saturday Freedom divided into two parts, Part 1 airing at 5:15PM KST and Part 2 airing at 6:15PM KST, in an effort to boost ratings.

Broadcasting Times 
 June 4–11, 2011 (17:35 - 19:55 ; 2 hours 20 minutes)
 June 18 – September 3, 2011 (17:50 - 19:55 ; 2 hour 5 minutes)
 September 10, 2011 – March 31, 2012 (17:15 - 19:55 ; 2 hours 40 minutes)
 September 10, 2011 – March 31, 2012 (17:15 - 18:15 ; 1 hour ; Part 1)
 September 10, 2011 – March 31, 2012 (18:15 - 19:55 ; 1 hour 40 minutes ; Part 2)

Segments

Birth of a Family 
Aired: November 12, 2011 – March 31, 2012
Starring: Lee Hwi-jae, Kim Byung-man, Boom, No Woo-jin, Hyuna (4Minute), G.NA, Yim Si-wan (ZE:A).

Birth of a Family (Korean: 가족의 탄생) was an "animal communion variety" program and was first broadcast on November 12, 2011.
The program is divided into two corners, Let's Live Together (같이 삽시다) and Birth of a Family (가족의 탄생). Let's Live Together features Lee Hwi-jae and Kim Byung-man as rare animals visit their home. Birth of a Family features idol groups living with and becoming the family of abandoned dogs, and helping them find new owners. Infinite and A Pink were the first groups of idols and were replaced with Hyuna of 4Minute, G.NA, and Siwan of ZE:A in March.

Immortal Songs 2 

Aired: June 4, 2011 - March 31, 2012 (in Saturday Freedom. Airs today as stand-alone program.)
Starring: Shin Dong-yup, Eun Ji-won, Moon Hee-joon.
Immortal Songs 2: Singing the Legend (Korean: 불후의 명곡 II - 전설을 노래하다; Romanized: Bulhueui Myeonggok II - Jeonseoleul Noraehada) is a music competition program and began airing on June 4, 2011. It is a revival of Immortal Songs, and features idol singers performing songs of legendary singers. The singers perform in front of an audience who vote for who they believe best presented the classic songs. It now airs as a separate program, as Immortal Songs 2: Singing the Legend, in the same time slot.

Secret 

Aired: June 4 - November 5, 2011
Starring: Lee Hwi-jae, Shin Bong-sun, Kim Hee-chul.
Secret (Korean: 시크릿) (Subtitle: Are You a Good Person?) was a game-talk show featuring secrets of celebrities. Stars must play games and succeed to prevent a secret of theirs from being revealed by a friend. Originally airing after Immortal Songs 2, the program faced difficulty when Immortal Songs 2 aired for too long, thus eating into the airtime of Secret. On one occasion, the program only aired for three minutes on July 23, 2011.

References

External links 
  

Korean Broadcasting System original programming
South Korean variety television shows
South Korean reality television series
Saturday mass media
Korean-language television shows
2011 South Korean television series debuts
2012 South Korean television series endings